WWSB (channel 40) is a television station licensed to Sarasota, Florida, United States, serving the Suncoast portion of the Tampa Bay market as an affiliate of ABC. The station also operates a news bureau in Venice, Florida.

Even though WWSB broadcasts on digital channel 24 and its virtual channel is 40, the station is branded as ABC 7 because of its channel on most cable systems in the market.

Broadcast coverage
Due to this station's transmitter location and the changeover from analog to digital transmission, its coverage area expands as far north as southern Pasco and western Polk counties, south to Punta Gorda, and east to Avon Park and Sebring giving some over-the-air viewers a choice of two or three ABC affiliates depending on the location.

As a result, WWSB is technically a secondary ABC affiliate particularly for the eastern side of Tampa Bay. The city of Tampa itself is on the rim of WWSB's digital signal where receivable through indoor antennas. On cable, the station is the sole ABC affiliate on Comcast's southern Sarasota County systems and it competes with Fort Myers-based WZVN-TV (also known on-air as "ABC 7") in DeSoto and Charlotte counties. WWSB also competes with Orlando's ABC affiliate WFTV in Hardee County.

WWSB has faced an uphill battle gaining carriage on cable and satellite providers in some cases. While DirecTV started carrying WWSB in 2009, Dish Network did not carry the station until March 2012, and only in standard definition. It was not available in high definition on Dish until 2017. Verizon FiOS added the station to its Hillsborough and Pasco County systems in October 2006 and eventually to its entire West Central Florida service area, as the system expanded. Those achievements greatly increased WWSB's coverage area and its overlap with WFTS-TV (channel 28). In December 2013, non-duplication rules enforced by ABC and cable companies threatened to remove WWSB from all Verizon FiOS systems due to the presence of WFTS-TV. WFTS worked with WWSB to retain local and syndicated programming on the provider, while blocking only the duplicated network programming, allowing WWSB to remain on FiOS.

History

The station first signed on the air on October 23, 1971, as WXLT-TV ("XL Television", with "XL" representing the Roman numeral for "40"). It was the first network-affiliated station in West Central Florida that was neither based in Tampa nor St. Petersburg. The station originally operated from studios located on Lawton Drive in Sarasota. It signed on to provide ABC programming in an area of the state that was insufficiently covered by the signal of WLCY-TV (channel 10, now WTSP) because of that station's lower-powered transmitter location well north of the Tampa Bay area's other television stations at the time. Until WLCY upgraded its facilities in the late 1970s, both that station and WXLT competed for viewers in Hillsborough and Pinellas counties. It was not uncommon to see WXLT's billboards in Tampa, St. Petersburg or Largo. In the 1970s, WXLT also cleared some CBS and NBC programming not carried by their respective Tampa Bay stations, WTVT (channel 13) and WFLA-TV (channel 8). In 1972, for example, when The Joker's Wild debuted on CBS, it was preempted on WTVT but carried by WXLT.

The call letters were changed to the current WWSB on August 31, 1986. That same year, Robert Nelson sold the station to Calkins Media (formerly Southern Broadcast Corporation). On cable, WFTS (now the area's primary ABC affiliate after a market realignment triggered by Fox's purchase of WTVT) was not carried south of the Sarasota area while WWSB was not largely available on cable north of the Sunshine Skyway Bridge until Verizon FiOS added WWSB to all of its area lineups. The latter was due to contractual conditions drawn up in the early 1990s by WTSP and later WFTS.

On September 27, 1994, WWSB received an affiliation termination notice from ABC, likely related to the network's forced change to WFTS. Had the station not successfully petitioned the Federal Communications Commission (FCC) to keep its affiliation, the 23-year-long ABC affiliation would have ended on April 2, 1995.

On November 5, 2001, the station relocated its operations from its longtime studios on Lawton Drive to its current location in the Rosemary District of Sarasota. In March 2004, the station dropped all mentions of its over-the-air signal on UHF channel 40 and rebranded as "ABC 7" (with the logo rebranded as a slightly modified version of the Circle 7 logo used by most of ABC's O&O stations) in reference to its cable channel position on Bright House Networks and Comcast in the station's service area. However, channel 7 is not WWSB's universal cable channel position: Comcast's Wauchula system carries it on channel 2 and its Port Charlotte system offers WWSB on channel 10, since its home market's ABC station WZVN-TV is carried on channel 7.

WWSB has been digital-only since February 1, 2009.

The station and its former sports director, Don Brennan, have been featured on a "webisode", along with an actual episode, of the ABC/TBS show Cougar Town, which is set in a fictional community in Sarasota County.

On April 11, 2016, it was reported that Calkins would exit the broadcasting industry and sell its stations to Raycom Media. The sale was completed on April 30, 2017. On June 25, 2018, Gray Television announced its intent to acquire Raycom for $3.65 billion. The sale was completed on January 2, 2019.

Programming

Syndicated programming
Syndicated programming featured on WWSB includes Funny You Should Ask, Rachael Ray and Celebrity Page. In previous years, WWSB carried generally the same syndicated programs as the other Tampa Bay stations, despite the overlap in signals, such as The Rosie O'Donnell Show (which was also broadcast by WTVT during its entire run), Extra (also seen on WFLA-TV) and M*A*S*H (seen over the years on many stations, most recently on WTVT) as well as Men Are from Mars, Women Are from Venus (which was also seen on WFTS) in the 2000-01 season. From 2007 until the fall of 2012, WWSB carried Sony Pictures Television's Jeopardy! and Wheel of Fortune on weekday evenings, simultaneously with WFTS; on September 17, 2012, WTSP reacquired local rights to Jeopardy! and Wheel for the entire Tampa Bay market, forcing CBS Television Distribution to remove the shows from WWSB, which replaced both shows with a double run of Who Wants to Be a Millionaire at 7 and 7:30 p.m. (because of Millionaires cancellation in 2019, the time slots are now occupied by an expanded newscast).

Locally produced programming

Animal Outtakes
Animal Outtakes is a locally produced animated/live action educational program about pets and animals hosted by Marsha Panuce.

Black Almanac
Black Almanac is a locally produced public affairs program that airs on Sunday mornings at 7:30 a.m. It is hosted by Ed James, a longtime anchor and personality of the station who has been with channel 40 since just after its sign-on as WXLT. The program focuses on the issues that African Americans face in the community, and has aired since 1972, making it the longest-running locally-produced public affairs program in the Southeastern United States.

The Suncoast View
The Suncoast View is a locally produced talk show based on the ABC talk show The View. It airs weekdays at 9 a.m. and is hosted by Stephanie Roberts (who also serves as the show's moderator), Joey Panek, and Linda Carson. It premiered on September 8, 2014, at 4 p.m.

News operation
WWSB presently broadcasts 43½ hours of locally produced newscasts each week (with 7½ hours each weekday and three hours each on Saturdays and Sundays).
The station's news department focuses its coverage on Sarasota and Manatee counties with occasional coverage of Charlotte County. The station also includes DeSoto and Hardee counties in its viewing area. In addition to its main studios, WWSB has a reporter covering southern Sarasota County and to a lesser extent, Charlotte County.

During the station's early days, WXLT's news coverage focused on local news and events, but to improve ratings, later expanded to "blood and guts" journalism focusing mainly on crime stories. On July 15, 1974, news reporter and talk show host Christine Chubbuck committed suicide by shooting herself in the head with a revolver on live television, making a reference to the station's "blood and guts" policies in her final monologue. She was the first person to commit suicide on live television. Her suicide occurred the day after a story she filed was cut for a story on a shootout at an area restaurant. The suicide would later provide part of the inspiration for the Academy Award-winning 1976 film, Network, and would be dramatized in the 2016 film, Christine.

Notable former on-air staff
 Christine Chubbuck – anchor (1971–1974; committed suicide on live television)
 Brad Giffen – 5:30 p.m. anchor/reporter (2003–2008; currently at CFTO-DT and CTV News Channel)
 Kevin Negandhi – weekday sports anchor (1999–2002, 2004–2006; currently at ESPN)
 Craig Sager – reporter (1970s, later at Turner Sports; died in 2016)

Subchannels
The station's digital signal is multiplexed:

See also
Channel 7 branded TV stations in the United States
Channel 24 digital TV stations in the United States
Channel 40 virtual TV stations in the United States

References

External links
Official website

Sarasota, Florida
ABC network affiliates
Circle (TV network) affiliates
Gray Television
Television channels and stations established in 1971
WSB
1971 establishments in Florida